Krudt og klunker is a 1958 Danish comedy film directed by Annelise Hovmand and starring Gunnar Lauring.

Cast

Gunnar Lauring as Professor Edward Jacobsen
Vera Gebuhr as Fru Wilhelmine Jacobsen
Sigrid Horne-Rasmussen as Faster Ragnhild Jacobsen
Ellen Nielsen as Bedstemor
Elga Olga Svendsen as Kokkepigen Kathrine
Johannes Meyer as Professor Ferdinand Schrøder
Vivi Bach as Therese Schrøder (as Vivi Bak)
Jørgen Reenberg as Hans
Kjeld Petersen as Slangetæmmer Hermansen
Dirch Passer as Fotograf
Kai Selliken as Karl Jacobsen
Eva Cohn as Magda Jacobsen
Anders Cohn as Benjamin Jacobsen
Poul Finn Poulsen as Emil Jacobsen
Susanne Randrup as Anna Jacobsen
Charlotte Stig-Poulsen as Viktor Jacobsen
Alfred Wilken as Postbudet
Ingeborg Skov as Enkepastorinde Sartorius
Ole Monty as 1. betjent
Johannes Marott as 2. betjent
Povl Wøldike as Den vagthavende assistant
Professor Tribini as Børsten
Tao Michaëlis as Deliristen
Lise Thomsen as Nyhavnpigen
Karen Rud as Enkefru Poulsen (Bedstemors faster)
Svend Bille as Apoteker Madsen
Mogens Brandt as Værten
Jørgen Ryg as Pianisten
Nick Miehe as Violinisten
Klaus Nielsen as Havebetjenten
Lili Heglund as Ammen
Miskow Makwarth as Kustoden
Peter Kitter as Neaderthaleren
Bernhard Brasso as Den svensktalende, polske Styrmand
Minna Jørgensen as Den gamle Neanderthalerkone
Charles Rhodes as Negeren
Vera Stricker as Anden Nyhavnspige
Victor Montell as Fortæller (Benjamin som gammel)

External links

1958 films
1958 comedy films
1950s Danish-language films
Danish comedy films
Danish black-and-white films
Films directed by Annelise Hovmand